Japanese rock duo B'z has released 22 studio albums, 12 compilation albums, eight extended plays (EP), 57 singles and 19 live albums. With more than 82 million sales in Japan, the duo is the best-selling artist in Japan and with 100 million sales one of the best-selling music artists of all time.

Albums

Studio albums

Compilation albums

Live albums

Extended plays

Singles

Other

B'z songs recorded by other musicians
 Eric Suen recorded "Easy Come, Easy Go!" as the theme for the 2000 Taiwanese drama, Huai Yu Gong Zhu. The title of the Chinese version is "Wei Feng Shi Ke".
 Priscilla Chan released a Cantonese version of "Native Dance" called " on her 1993 album .
 Aya Kamiki covered "Pierrot" as her second major-label single in 2006.
 Aya Kamiki has also included "Love Phantom" and "Juice" in several of her live performances.
 An arrangement of "Atsuki Kodō no Hate" appeared as a stage theme in the 2005 Nintendo DS rhythm game Osu! Tatakae! Ouendan. The performance is credited to Tetsushi Kimura.
 Eric Martin released an English version of "いつかのメリークリスマス" (Itsuka no Merry Christmas) on Mr. Vocalist X'mas (2009) and "Alone" on Mr. Rock Vocalist (2012).
 Longtime drummer for the band, Shane Gaalaas,  released an English cover of "Brotherhood" on his 2013 album Ascend.

Songs covered by B'z
 "This Love" by Maroon 5 on The Complete B'z.
"Sexual Violet No. 1" by Masahiro Kuwana on Take Me to Kazemachi!: Takashi Matsumoto 50th Anniversary Tribute Album.
 "Oh! Darling" by The Beatles on B'z Live-Gym Pleasure 2008 -Glory Days-.
 "Let It Be" by The Beatles on Music Station Special.
 "Train Kept A-Rollin'" by Tiny Bradshaw at the 2002 FIFA World Cup International Day Concert (with Aerosmith).
 "Mama Kin" by Aerosmith at Aerosonic (with Aerosmith).
 "Crazy Night" by Loudness at B'z Special Live at Ex Theater Roppongi and Rockrock 20th Anniversary Live "Rock Beyond Rock" (with Loudness).
 "Sweet Child O' Mine" by Guns N' Roses" was played live during the B'z Live-Gym '91~'92 "In the Life" tour.
 "Jealous Guy" by  John Lennon/Plastic Ono Band on Music Fair.
 "Knockin' on Heaven's Door" by Bob Dylan on Music Fair and was played live during the B'z Live-Gym '91~'92 "In the Life" tour.

Featured songs
 "Into Free" was used as the title song for the Capcom video game Dragon's Dogma.
 "Receive You Reborn" was used as an intro theme and battle theme in the Japanese version of the SEGA video game Yakuza: Kiwami
 "哀しきDreamer", B-Side from "Fireball" single, was used in the PlayStation game Indy 500. 
 During the height of The X-Files''' popularity in Japan, "Love Phantom" was used as the closing credits theme song.
 "Devil", an English cover of their song "Tokyo Devil", was produced for the 2002 FIFA World Cup Korea/Japan.
 "兵、走る" (Tsuwamono, Hashiru) was produced to be a theme song for the 2019 Rugby World Cup official sponsor Lipovitan. Thus, this song is a "rugby song", used in several rugby TV broadcast channels, like  J-Sports and The Rugby Channel. 
 "Atsuki Kodou no Hate" appears in the arcade drumming game Taiko no Tatsujin 4, and recently in the Nintendo DS rhythm game Osu! Tatakae! Ouendan.
 "Bad Communication" appears in the Game Boy Color rhythm game beatmania GB GotchaMIX2.
 "Kon'ya Tsuki no Mieru Oka ni" was used in the 2000 TV drama Beautiful Life.
 "Change the Future" was used as the Japanese opening theme for the 2003 TV series Zentrix.
 "Ocean" was used in the 2005 TV drama of the Umizaru Evolution project.
 Koshi Inaba's "Akai Ito" was used as one of the ending themes for the 2006 anime Kekkaishi. "Liar! Liar!" appears in the arcade and PlayStation 2 rhythm game GuitarFreaks 4th Mix & DrumMania 3rd Mix (known on the PS2 as GitaDora! GuitarFreaks 4th Mix & DrumMania 3rd Mix). This song has been removed from the series as of GuitarFreaks 7th Mix & DrumMania 6th Mix.
 "ultra soul" appears in the arcade drumming game Taiko no Tatsujin 2. It also appears in Rocksmith 2014.
 "Friction" is featured on the PlayStation 2 and PlayStation Portable game Burnout Dominator. This marked their first appearance in a western video game. It is also included in the PlayStation 3 and Xbox 360 game Burnout Paradise, as well as its HD remaster available on PlayStation 4, Nintendo Switch, Xbox One, and PC.
 Several B'z and solo songs were used in the Detective Conan anime series:
 "Giri Giri Chop" (TV series OP Ep. 143–167)
 "One" (Movie No. 3 ED)
 Koshi Inaba's "Overture" (TV series ED Ep. 300-306)
 "Everlasting" (Movie No. 6 ED)
 "Shoudou" (TV series OP Ep. 425–437)
 "Yuruginaimono Hitotsu" (Movie No. 10 ED)
 "Don't Wanna Lie" (Movie No. 15 ED & TV Series OP Ep. 613-626)
 "Pilgrim" (TV series ED Ep. 627-628 & Magic Kaito ED Ep. 1-2)
 "Q&A"  (TV series OP Ep. 696–717)
 "Sekai wa Anata no Iro ni Naru" (Movie No. 20 ED & TV series OP Ep. 817–844)
 "Sleepless"  (TV series OP Ep. 1033–1048)
 "Roots" was also used as the ending theme to the four-part Black Jack OVA series to promote the then newest TV series. Tak Matsumoto also did the opening "The Theme of B.J."
 "Lonely Stars" was used in the ending credits in the movie,  which is part of the Fist of the North Star anime series.
 "Ore to Omae no Atarashii Kisetsu" is currently used as the ending theme to the Japanese dub of The O.C..
 "Mienai Chikara ~Invisible one~" was the first ending theme to the anime Hell Teacher Nube.
 "Ichibu to Zenbu" was used as the theme song for the Fuji TV 2009 drama Buzzer Beat starring Yamashita Tomohisa and Keiko Kitagawa.
 "Signal" and "Utsukushiki Sekai" were used as the opening theme and the ending theme respectively for the 2002 female-oriented dating sim video game Tokimeki Memorial Girl's Side''.
 "Wolf" was used as the ending theme for the Japanese TV show Suits.

References

External links
B'z Official Web Site(in English)
B'z Official Web Site(in Japanese)

Discography
Discographies of Japanese artists
Rock music group discographies